Live Sky Tour is a live album by Industrial band The Young Gods covering their 1992 tour in support of their album T.V. Sky. It was recorded on May 30, 1992.

Track listing
 "Intro" – 2:49
 "T.V. Sky" – 3:49
 "Jimmy" – 2:37
 "Envoyé!/Chanson Rouge" – 5:02
 "L'Eau Rouge" – 3:43
 "Skinflowers" – 5:23
 "She Rains" – 2:50
 "Summer Eyes" – 13:40
 "Pas Mal" – 2:58
 "Longue Route" – 4:48
 "September Song" – 4:00
 "Seeräuber Jenny" – 6:25

Personnel
 Al Mono (Alain Monod) – Keyboards, Producer, Mixing
 Üse Drums (Urs Hiestand) – Drums
 Phil McKellar – Recording
 Kevin Metcalfe – Mastering
 Franz Reise (Franz Treichler) – Vocals
 Bertrand Siffert – Producer, Mixing

References

The Young Gods albums
1993 live albums
Albums produced by Franz Treichler
PIAS Recordings albums